Nankana is a Punjabi language movie released on 6 July 2018. Gurdas Maan played lead role in the movie along with Kavita Kaushik, and Gurmeet Sajan. Gurdas Maan is back on big screen after four years. Film was directed by Manjeet Maan.

Plot

Nankana revolves around the strong bond between a father and a son. At the same time, it gives a very noteworthy message that not everyone can get everything in life; thus, one should not lose his/her calm, Karma must protect his adopted son (Born to a Muslim) from people due to riots as well as from his evil brother Taari.

Cast
 Gurdas Maan
 Kavita Kaushik
 Anas Rashid
 Gurmeet Sajan

Soundtracks

References

External links
 

2018 films
Punjabi-language Indian films
2010s Punjabi-language films
Indian drama films
Partition of India in fiction
Films set in the British Raj
Films scored by Jatinder Shah